Tiny Voices is the ninth studio album by Joe Henry, released in September 2003, and his first release on the ANTI- label. Tiny Voices features a unique production sound, quite discordant and unpolished in comparison to Henry's previous album Scar in 2001. Joe assembled a group of accomplished musicians, and provided them only with basic demo versions of each song. From there, he asked the musicians to "learn" the songs while they were being recorded. Henry felt this more ungroomed approach was in alignment with the themes of the album.

The song "Flesh and Blood" was originally written by Henry for Solomon Burke to record on Don't Give Up on Me, Burke's Grammy-award-winning album, which Henry produced. The song "Animal Skin" was previously recorded by Joe for the Groundwork: Act to Reduce Hunger charity album.

Track listing 
All tracks composed by Joe Henry.

 "This Afternoon" – 5:44
 "Animal Skin" – 5:54
 "Tiny Voices" – 6:41
 "Sold" – 5:29
 "Dirty Magazine" – 4:38
 "Flag" – 5:09
 "Loves You Madly" – 4:10
 "Lighthouse" – 5:11
 "Widows of the Revolution" – 4:38
 "Leaning" – 5:24
 "Flesh and Blood" – 5:34
 "Your Side of My World" – 7:19

Personnel 
 Joe Henry - vocals, guitar
 Don Byron - clarinets, tenor saxophone
 Ron Miles - trumpet
 Dave Palmer - keyboards
 Patrick Warren - keyboards
 Chris Bruce - guitar
 Gregg Arreguin - guitar on 9
 Jennifer Condos - bass
 Jay Bellerose - drums, percussion
 Jim Keltner - drums
 Niki Harris - vocals
 Jean McClain - vocals

References 

Joe Henry albums
2003 albums
Albums produced by Joe Henry
Anti- (record label) albums